Neoponera verenae is a species of ponerine ant in the genus Neoponera.

Identification 
There are only a few species of Neoponera in which the workers lack erect hairs on the dorsum of the mesosoma (Neoponera magnifica, Neoponera bucki, Neoponera apicalis, Neoponera obscuricornis and Neoponera verenae). However, in Neoponera apicalis, the tips of the antennae has a yellow to light brown funiculus. The difference between Neoponera obscuricornis and Neoponera verenae is that the posterior lateral margins of the petiole of N. verenae are sharp, those of N. obscuricornis are broadly rounded.

References 

Ponerinae